Yvan Mayeur (born 24 January 1960 in Etterbeek) is a former Belgian politician, former member of the Socialist Party and former mayor of Brussels from 2013 until 2017.

Nationally, Mayeur was a member of the Chamber of Representatives since 1999, and previously from 1989 to 1995.

Locally, Mayeur is elected city councillor of Brussels since 1995 and the chairperson of the CPAS/OCMW of Brussels until he took office as mayor of Brussels on 13 December 2013, succeeding Freddy Thielemans who resigned due to his age. In 2017, Majeur was forced to offer his resignation as mayor of Brussels after it had become apparent that he had stolen from
, a municipal humanitarian emergency service for the homeless in Brussels. He was entitled to receive a fee for each meeting, but the number of meetings had been increased tremendously, with many of them not even having taken place.

Mayeur quit the Socialist Party on 30 June 2017, days before the party leadership would deliberate about his membership. He was succeeded as mayor of Brussels by Philippe Close (PS).

References

External links 
 

Mayors of the City of Brussels
Members of the Chamber of Representatives (Belgium)
Socialist Party (Belgium) politicians
1960 births
Living people
21st-century Belgian politicians